Kara Louise Tointon (born 5 August 1983) is an English actress, known for portraying the role of Dawn Swann in the BBC soap opera EastEnders. In 2010, she won the BBC competition series Strictly Come Dancing, and in 2015, she appeared as Maria in the ITV live production of The Sound of Music Live.

Early life
Tointon was born to parents Ken (b. 1948) and Carol Tointon (1957–2019). Together with her actress sister, Hannah (born 1987), Tointon was brought up in Leigh-on-Sea. Both sisters attended St Michael's School, Leigh, and St Hilda's School, Westcliff-on-Sea, Essex. Tointon was diagnosed with dyslexia at age seven. She had speech and drama lessons. Tointon's debut in acting was when she played Brigitta in the local amateur dramatic society's version of The Sound of Music at the Cliffs Pavilion, Westcliff-on-Sea.

Career
Tointon's was a paid professional child dancer at age 11 for Snow White pantomime at the Cliffs Pavilion. Her first appearance on television was as a school friend of Sonia Fowler in EastEnders in 1994. She played the part of student Pauline Young in 2001's first series of Teachers on Channel 4. She also starred in BBC's Curriculum Bites as a presenter in 2002.

In 2005, Tointon joined the cast of the BBC soap EastEnders as Dawn Swann, a role she played for 4 years until being written out, along with co-star Ricky Groves, in August 2009. 

In January 2010, she made a guest appearance in the 26th and final series of ITV’s long-running police drama The Bill in "Duty Calls" as Ami Ryan.

In July 2010, she recorded a documentary for BBC Three called Kara Tointon: Don't Call Me Stupid. The programme examined the impact dyslexia can have on people's lives and the difference different learning styles can have on dyslexic people. Tointon revealed that she struggles as a dyslexic person, and had a reading age of 12. During the programme, Tointon visited Shapwick School in Somerset, which specialises in the education of dyslexic pupils, and talked with the pupils about their experiences.

Strictly Come Dancing

Sport Relief Edition
In 2008, Tointon won the Sport Relief special edition of Strictly Come Dancing with Mark Ramprakash. Her samba was enough to get her the Glitterball Trophy.

Series 8

In September 2010, Tointon was a contestant on Strictly Come Dancing Series 8, partnered with Artem Chigvintsev. The pair achieved good scores in the first five weeks of 30, 32, 31, 32 and 37. In week 5, Tointon was awarded the first 10 of the series by Alesha Dixon for her Pasodoble. In week 6 she was top of the leaderboard with her Salsa. She also had good scores for the next five weeks of 36, 38, 35, 34 and 38. In week 11, she got her highest score of 39 for the Viennese Waltz and Rumba and got the maximum 5/5 for the swing-a-thon. Tointon made it to the final along with Matt Baker and Pamela Stephenson, where she made it to the final two, then went on to win and be crowned champion.

West End theatre
From May to September 2011, Tointon played Eliza Doolittle in the West End production of Pygmalion at the Garrick Theatre, opposite Rupert Everett as Professor Higgins. In 2012, Tointon was cast as Evelyn in Alan Ayckbourn's revival of the 1974 play Absent Friends, alongside Reece Shearsmith at the Harold Pinter Theatre' She followed this by playing Giny in Ayckbourn's Relatively Speaking, with Felicity Kendal, Jonathan Coy, and Max Bennett at the Wyndham's Theatre in 2013.

Other work
In August 2009, she was unveiled as the new face of Michelle for George underwear at Asda.

In February 2011, Tointon took part in the BT Red Nose Desert Trek for Comic Relief 2011. In September, it was announced that Kara would play a lead role in the new film Last Passenger, opposite Dougray Scott and directed by Omid Nooshin.

In 2015 and 2016, Tointon played Rosalie Selfridge in the television drama series Mr Selfridge, the semi-fictional story based on the life of Harry Selfridge. Tointon played the part of Maria in The Sound of Music Live in the UK, broadcast on 20 December.

In January 2017, Tointon appeared in the ITV period drama The Halcyon, which was set in 1940 at a five-star hotel “at the centre of London Society and a world at war”. From November, Tointon played the role of Olivia in The Royal Shakespeare Company production of Twelfth Night.

In 2018, Tointon joined 26 other celebrities at Metropolis Studios, to perform an original Christmas song called Rock With Rudolph, written and produced by Grahame and Jack Corbyn. The song was released in aid of Great Ormond Street Hospital and was released digitally on independent record label Saga Entertainment on 30 November 2018 under the artist name The Celebs. The music video debuted exclusively with The Sun on 29 November 2018 and had its first TV showing on Good Morning Britain on 30 November 2018. The song peaked at number two on the iTunes pop chart.

Selected stage credits
 Pygmalion, Garrick Theatre, London, 2011
 Absent Friends, Harold Pinter Theatre, London, 2012
 Relatively Speaking, Wyndhams Theatre, London, 2013
 Gaslight, Touring Production - various cities in England, 2017
 Twelfth Night, Royal Shakespeare Theatre, Stratford-upon-Avon, 2017–18
The Man in the White Suit, Theatre Royal Bath and Wyndham's Theatre, London, 2019

Personal life
In September 2014, Tointon took part in the Great North Run to raise money for Share A Star, a charity set up to help severely unwell children and teenagers.

In November 2018, Tointon gave birth to her first child, a boy, with her then fiancé Marius Jensen. In January 2021, their second son was born.

Filmography

Awards and nominations

References

External links
 

1983 births
Living people
20th-century English actresses
21st-century English actresses
Actors with dyslexia
Actresses from Essex
English child actresses
English film actresses
English stage actresses
English soap opera actresses
English television actresses
People from Southend-on-Sea
Strictly Come Dancing winners